The Communauté de communes Cœur d'Ostrevent is a federation of municipalities (communauté de communes) in the Nord département and in the Nord-Pas-de-Calais région of France. Its seat is Lewarde. Its area is 138.2 km2, and its population was 71,066 in 2018.

Composition 
The communauté de communes consists of the following 20 communes:

Aniche
Auberchicourt
Bruille-lez-Marchiennes
Écaillon
Erre
Fenain
Hornaing
Lewarde
Loffre
Marchiennes
Masny
Monchecourt
Montigny-en-Ostrevent
Pecquencourt
Rieulay
Somain
Tilloy-lez-Marchiennes
Vred
Wandignies-Hamage
Warlaing

See also
Communes of the Nord department

References

Coeur d'Ostrevent
Commune communities in France